Stančići may refer to:

 Stančići, Serbia, a village near Čačak, Serbia
 Stančići, Croatia, a village near Bjelovar, Croatia